Karchana is a town in Allahabad district in the Indian state of Uttar Pradesh. The town is administered by a Village panchayat system. Karchana lies in the central part of the Allahabad district. The town is located 21 km south of Allahabad, the district headquarters. Karchana is one of eight Tehsils in Allahabad District.

See also
Antahiya
Basahi Banzar

References

Cities and towns in Allahabad district